Ripley's Bureau of Investigation is a series of children's fiction books published by Ripley Publishing in the United States and distributed by Random House in the United Kingdom and Icewater Press in Australia. It consists of eight published books. Two later books in the series, Danger Underground and Haunted Hotel, remained unpublished until they recently appeared exclusively on the children's reading app, Pickatale. The series was intended to have twelve books in total, but it discontinued, likely due to low sales.

The series follows seven extraordinary pupils at the fictional 'Ripley High', based on "Ripley's Believe it or Not!" founder Robert Ripley's real-life mansion on a private island in Long Island Sound on the East Coast of the United States. In the books Robert Ripley is represented by a supercomputer. The chosen pupils, each with unique powers and skills, form the Ripley's Bureau of Investigation, tasked with investigating unusual stories and facts around the world.

Characters

D.U.L. Agents
The "Department of Unbelievable Lies" are mysterious villains in the RBI stories who work against the RBI agents.

RBI Agents and other characters

Other regular characters include the teachers Mr Cain and Dr Maxwell, who assist the RBI in their missions.

Titles

References

External links
 RBI website
 BBC Newsround review
 Random House
 Bin Weevils Feature

Series of children's books
American children's novels
Ripley's Believe It or Not!